The 29th Meijin was the 29th Meijin tournament of the board game go. The tournament was held in 2004 in Japan and was won by Cho U.

Challenger Group

Challenger Final

Final 

Go competitions in Japan
2004 in Japanese sport
2004 in go